General elections were held in Malaysia on 2 and 3 August 1986. Voting took place in all 177 parliamentary constituencies of Malaysia, each electing one Member of Parliament to the Dewan Rakyat, the dominant house of Parliament. State elections also took place in 351 state constituencies in eleven of the thirteen states.

Results

By state

Johor

Kedah

Kelantan

Kuala Lumpur

Labuan

Malacca

Negeri Sembilan

Pahang

Penang

Perak

Perlis

Sabah

Sarawak

Selangor

Terengganu

See also
1986 Malaysian state elections

References

General elections in Malaysia
Malaysia
General